Association Sportive Artistique et Culturelle de la Concorde known as ASAC Concorde is a Mauritanean football club based in Nouakchott.

History
ASAC Concorde was founded in Nouakchott on 1979. It's one of the oldest clubs in Mauritania.

Crest

Achievements
Mauritanean Premier League
Champions (2): 2008, 2017.

Coupe du Président de la République
Winners (1): 2009.
Runners-up : 2012, 2014, 2016.

Coupe de la Ligue Nationale
Winners (1): 2012.
Runners-up : 2015, 2018, 2019.

Mauritanian Super Cup
Winners (2): 2012, 2017.
Runners-up : 2016.

Performance in CAF competitions
CAF Champions League: 1 appearance
2018 - Preliminary Round

CAF Confederation Cup: 2 appearances
2005 - Round of 32
2007 - Preliminary Round

External links
Team profile - maurifoot.net

Football clubs in Mauritania
Association football clubs established in 1979
Sport in Nouakchott